The SCR-508 radio was a mobile Signal Corps Radio used by the U.S. Army during World War II, for short range ground communications. The SCR-508 series radio represented the Army's commitment to both FM and crystal tuning, and was used extensively by armor and mechanized units. The turret bustle of late series light and medium tanks was designed around this radio.

Use
The SCR-508 series was standardized on 22 July 1941, and used by armored forces for command and control of tank units. It replaced the earlier SCR-293 and SCR-245 and was used primarily in the M5 Stuart light tanks as well as the M4 Sherman medium tanks. It also provided the intercom system to all crew stations. It provided voice communications between tanks and other vehicles/units equipped with FM radios (such as the SCR-510 and others) operating in the same frequency range. One of 10 channels could be selected by the operator, a total of 80 channels were available for use at 100 kHz channel spacing.  Channels were referred to by a numerical identifier.  For example, 27.100 MHz was "channel 271", 25.000 MHz was "channel 250" and so on.   It was replaced by the AN/VRC-8 series radios.

Components
 BC-604 transmitter (FM, CW/voice), 10 crystal controlled channels 20.0 MHz to 27.9 MHz, 25 watts, range 
 DM-34 dynamotor (12 Volt input) or
 DM-36 dynamotor (24 Volt)
 BC-603 receiver (2 for 508 set)
 DM-35 dynamotor (12 volt input) or
 DM-37 dynamotor (24 volt)
 FT-237 mount or rack
 CH-74 cabinet for use in open command vehicles (FT-284 Legs)
 MP-52 mast base for CH-74
 MP-48 antenna base, and  whip antenna
 CH-264 chest for parts and accessories (could be slid into mount in place of receiver)
 T-17 microphone
 HS-30 headset
 RM-29 telephone patch set
 BC-606 intercom box, at crew stations
 I-208 signal generator (TM 11-317)

Variants
Different combinations of components could be arranged in the mounts.
 SCR-528 transmitter and single receiver
 SCR-538 Receiver and BC-605 Amplifier (for intercom)
 AN/VRC-5 Separately mounted transmitter and receiver
 FT-508 mount (transmitter)
 FT-345 mount (receiver)
The Artillery branch used the same radios mirroring the SCR-508 series but with a different frequency range
 SCR-608
 BC-684 transmitter 27.0 MHz to 38.9 MHz at 35 watts, for 
 BC-683 receiver
 SCR-628

See also

 Signal Corps Radio
 Crystal oscillator
 Wireless Set No. 19

References

General references
 TM 11-487 Electrical Communications Equipment
 TM 11-600 SCR-508 operators 
 TM 11-620 SCR-608 operators 
 Radio to free Europe

External links
SCR List US Army Signal Corps Museum
BC List US Army Signal Corps Museum
SCR-508 WWII Vehicle Radio Set YouTube

Amateur radio transmitters
Military radio systems of the United States
World War II American electronics
Military electronics of the United States
Military equipment introduced from 1940 to 1944